The Belgian railway line 94 is a railway line in Belgium connecting Halle with Tournai and the French border near Baisieux. Beyond Baisieux the line continues to the French city Lille. The line was opened between 1847 and 1866, and a section between Ath and Enghien was straightened in 1985.

Stations
The main interchange stations on line 94 are:

Halle: to Brussels and Mons
Enghien: to Geraardsbergen  
Ath: to Geraardsbergen and Mons
Tournai: to Kortrijk, Mons and Saint-Ghislain

References

94
Railway lines opened in 1847
3000 V DC railway electrification